The Victory Destroyer Plant was a United States Naval Shipbuilding yard operational from 1918 to 1920 in Quincy, Massachusetts. It was then reused as a civil airport, and later Naval Air Station Squantum. It was owned by the Bethlehem Shipbuilding Corporation, and was constructed in order to relieve destroyer construction at the nearby Fore River Shipyard.  Still later in the late 1920s it was used to build yachts by the firm Lamb & O'Connell.  One of these yachts, the US10 Tipler III, a 30-square-meter racing yacht, participated in the 1929 International Races sponsored by the Corinthian Yacht Club of Marblehead.

Ships Constructed

References

External links
Images of the plant
Images of the yard, on History.navy.mil

Shipyards of Massachusetts
Buildings and structures in Quincy, Massachusetts
Defunct shipbuilding companies of the United States
Fore River Shipyard
Bethlehem shipyards
Defunct manufacturing companies based in Massachusetts
1918 establishments in Massachusetts
1920 disestablishments in Massachusetts